Enafors is a village in Åre Municipality in Jämtland County, Sweden. The Middle Line runs through Enafors.

References 

Populated places in Åre Municipality
Jämtland